The Dean of Chichester is the dean of Chichester Cathedral in Sussex, England.

Bishop Ralph is credited with the foundation of the current cathedral after the original structure built by Stigand was largely destroyed by fire in 1114.

Ralph did not confine his activities just to rebuilding the cathedral; he provided for a more complete constitution of his chapter by also creating the offices of Dean, Precentor, Chancellor and Treasurer. The function of these four officials was to ensure the proper conduct of church services, the care of the church building and the supervision of subordinates. Beneath these four officials were the canons of the cathedral who in the medieval period were about twenty six in number. The dean would have been elected by the canons, and would have the power to act in administrative matters only with their consent.
 The dean and his staff, however, were subject to the bishop's authority.
 
The dean headed the cathedral community and had jurisdiction over all the Chichester city parishes, with the exception of All Saints, which was under the administration of the Archbishop of Canterbury. The four ancient posts of dean and canons still exist within the cathedral and their functions are similar to their ancient role, although somewhat diminished, as other church organisations have now taken over some of their powers.

There follows a list of deans of Chichester, from Bishop Ralph's time, to the present dean, Stephen Waine.

List of deans

High Medieval
1115 Odo
1115 Richard
1125 Matthew
1144 Richard
1150 John de Greneford (afterwards Bishop of Chichester, 1173)
1176 Jordan de Meleburn
1178 Seffrid II (afterwards Bishop of Chichester, 1180)
1180 Matthew de Chichester
1190 Nicholas de Aquila
1197 Seffride
1210–1212 In the hands of the king
1220 Simon de Perigord
1230 Walter
1232 Thomas de Lichfield
1250 Geoffrey
1256 Walter de Glocestria
1295 Thomas de Berghstede

Late Medieval
?-1306 William de Grenefeld (afterwards Archbishop of York, 1306)
1307-1308 Raymond de Goth or Raimundus de Got, Cardinal Deacon of Santa Maria Nova
1308-1316John de St Leophardo
1318-1340 Henry de Garland
?-1349 Walter de Segrave
1349-1362William Lenn (afterwards Bishop of Chichester, 1362)
1362-? Nicholas de Aston
?-1382 Roger de Freton
1382–1386 Richard le Scrope (afterwards Bishop of Coventry and Lichfield, 1386)
1389–1390 William de Lullyngton
?-1396 Stephen Palosius (Cardinal priest of S. Marcellus)

1396–1399 Christopher Marini (Cardinal priest of S. Cyriacus) 
1397–1407 John de Maydenhith (B.C.L.)
1407–1412 John Haseley
?–1417 Richard Talbot (afterwards Bishop of Dublin, 1417)
?–1424 William Milton
1425 John Patten or John Waynflete
1425-? John Crutchere
1455-1478 John Waynfleet
1479-1501 John Cloos
1501-1503 Robert Prychard
1504-? Geoffrey Symeon
1507-1510 John Young
1517-1518 Thomas Larke
1518-1541 William Fleshmonger

Early modern
1541–1548 Richard Caurden
1549–1551 Giles Eyre
1551–1553 Bartholomew Traheron
1553 Thomas Sampson (not installed)
1553–1557 William Pye
1558–1566 Hugh Turnbull
1566–1570 Richard Curteys (afterwards Bishop of Chichester, 1571)
1570–1577 Anthony Rushe
1577–1601 Martin Culpepper
1601–1630 William Thorne
1630–1634 Francis Dee (afterwards Bishop of Peterborough, 1634)
1634–1635 Richard Steward
1642 George Aglionby (nominal)
1646–1660 Bruno Ryves (afterwards Dean of Windsor, 1660)
1660–1663 Joseph Henshaw (afterwards Bishop of Peterborough, 1663)
1663–1669 Joseph Gulston

1669–1671 Nathaniel Crew (afterwards Bishop of Oxford, 1671)
1671–1672 Lambrocus Thomas
1672–1688 George Stradling
1688–1699 Francis Hawkins
1699–1715 William Hayley
1715–1727 Thomas Sherlock (afterwards Bishop of Bangor, 1727)
1727–1735 John Newey
1735–1739 Thomas Hayley
1739–1741 James Hargraves
1741–1754 William Ashburnham (afterwards Bishop of Chichester, 1754)
1754–1770 Thomas Ball
1770–1790 Charles Harward (afterwards Dean of Exeter, 1790)

Late modern
1790 Combe Miller
1814–1824 Christopher Bethell
1824 Samuel Slade
1830 George Chandler
1859–1875 Walter Hook
1876 John Burgon
1888 Francis Pigou (afterwards Dean of Bristol, 1892)
1892 Richard Randall 
1902 John Hannah
1929 Arthur Duncan Jones
1955 Walter Hussey
1977 Robert Holtby
1989 John Treadgold
2002–2014 Nicholas Frayling
2015–present Stephen Waine

See also
 Bishop of Chichester
 Archdeacon of Chichester

References

Sources
 
 
 
 	
 

 	
  – Subscription required.

Deans of Chichester
History of West Sussex
 
Chichester Cathedral
Dean of Chichester
Anglican ecclesiastical offices